Karmirgyugh or Gyzyloba is a village that is, de facto, in the Askeran Province of the breakaway Republic of Artsakh; de jure, it is in the Khojaly District of Azerbaijan, in the disputed region of Nagorno-Karabakh.

History 
During the Soviet period, the village was part of the Askeran District of the Nagorno-Karabakh Autonomous Oblast.

Historical heritage sites 
Historical heritage sites in and around the village include the 12th/13th-century Church of the Martyr, a 18th/19th-century cemetery, the church of Surb Astvatsatsin built in 1841, a spring monument from 1862, and a bridge built in 1864.

Economy and culture 
The population is mainly engaged in agriculture and animal husbandry. As of 2015, the village has a municipal building, a house of culture, a secondary school, and a medical centre.

Demographics 
The village has an ethnic Armenian-majority population. It had 174 inhabitants in 2005, and 171 inhabitants in 2015.

Gallery

References

External links 

 
 

Populated places in Askeran Province
Populated places in Khojaly District